Arthur Goodson House, also known as John M. Lide House, is a historic home located at Springville, Darlington County, South Carolina.  It was built in the 1850s, and is a -story, three bay, rectangular, central hall, weatherboard-clad, frame residence. The front façade features a full-width, hipped roof porch. Also on the property are two outbuildings, one weatherboard-clad, braced-frame building dating from the antebellum period and one tobacco barn constructed in the late-19th or early-20th century.

It was listed on the National Register of Historic Places in 1985.

References

Houses on the National Register of Historic Places in South Carolina
Houses completed in 1850
Houses in Darlington County, South Carolina
National Register of Historic Places in Darlington County, South Carolina